Mmuock (sometimes Mmock) is the Anglicised form of Muòk—sometimes written as Mǒk (see next paragraph). Mmuock is a tribe in the West/Southwest of Cameroon. Belonging to the Bamilike ethnic group, the Mmuock tribe comprises four villages: Mmuock Leteh, Mmuock Fossimondi, Mmockmbie, and Mmock Leleng . The first three villages are found in the English-speaking Lebialem Division in the Southwest Region of Cameroon, while Mmock Leleng lies in the french-speaking West Region.

The Mmuock tribe speaks the Mmuock (Mmock) language. As a result, there are two Anglicised spellings: Mmuock and Mmock.

Etymology 
The word Muòk (or Moòk) means fire in the Mmuock language. There have been two different origin stories to the name. According to the first story, when four brothers, who later founded the four villages, separated, each was to make a fire if attacked; the smoke from the fire would alert the others.  According to the second story, the name was given by the people of Bafou as a result of their inability to defeat and capture the four brothers.

Names of days of the week 
In the Mmuock culture, there are eight days in the week. The week days, in order, are as follow:
 Ngangà (the first day)
 Mbeqgnúá (Betaâgnúá)
 Mbeqlěq
 Njœêngong (Ngong)
 Mbeqńkœó
 Njœêlekœr̄
 Fa'à
 Télǎng (Njœeláh).

The first day, Ngangè, is a public holiday and a day of rest; no manual labour is permitted. The second day is the market day.

References 

Ethnic groups in Cameroon